"Échame la Culpa" is a song by Puerto Rican singer and songwriter Luis Fonsi and American singer Demi Lovato. Fonsi co-wrote the song with Alejandro Rengifo and its producers Andrés Torres and Mauricio Rengifo. It was released through Universal Music Latin Entertainment, Republic Records and Island Records on November 17, 2017, as the second single from his tenth studio album, Vida. On March 2, 2018, an English remix of the song titled "Not on You" was released.

The track received acclaim from music critics. It has reached number one in sixteen countries worldwide: Austria, Lebanon, Mexico, Spain, Romania, Argentina, Bolivia, Chile, Costa Rica, Ecuador, El Salvador, Guatemala, Honduras, Panama, Paraguay, Peru and Uruguay, as well as the top ten in Belgium, Germany, Hungary, Italy, Poland, Portugal, Slovakia, Sweden and Switzerland, the top twenty in Croatia, France, Greece, Latvia, the Netherlands and Norway, and the top thirty in Scotland. It also reached number forty-six in the UK and forty-seven on the US Billboard Hot 100. The song was the second-bestselling song of 2018 in Argentina and Slovenia. The song is certified Platinum or higher in twelve countries, including Diamond in Brazil, France, Poland, and Mexico.

Release and promotion
Lovato first teased a photo from the music video shoot via Instagram on October 21, 2017, to which Fonsi commented: "What's up Demi..." He later posted a behind-the-scenes picture on his official Instagram account, captioned: "Finished! It's a wrap", to which Lovato replied: "Hola Fonsi". On November 1, 2017, MTV News reported that the collaboration would be titled "Échame la Culpa", a song Fonsi has been performing solo during live shows across the summer. In an interview with Billboard at iHeartRadio Fiesta Latina in Miami, Fonsi admitted: "It's a fun song, a fun record, we already filmed the video." He also revealed that the song would premiere in two weeks. In a clip shared by Billboard on November 13, 2017, Lovato and Fonsi can be seen meeting each other via a FaceTime call to discuss details about their collaboration. On November 14, 2017, Lovato took to social media to announce the song's release, along with a snippet of the song featuring only her part, as Fonsi posted a shot of himself lying in bed with pillows covered in the song's title. It was released onto iTunes for download three days later, and Fonsi published a photo that day of a truck with him and Lovato on it, as well as short quotes, including "¿Qué pasa Demi?" (English: What's up Demi?) and "Hey Fonsi". Fonsi told Viva Latino: "The lyrics are very joyful. It's that play on words, that famous cliché of 'It's not you, it's me' that many of us have used." On April 12, 2018, Fonsi performed the song live together with German singer Helene Fischer during a medley with "Despacito" at the German Echo Music Prize.

Critical reception
The song received positive reviews from music critics. Jon Caramanica of The New York Times called the song "a jaunty, celebratory number", and felt Lovato singing in clipped Spanish is "only marginally less comfortable than the bumpy-edged English-language semi-soul she employs elsewhere on the song". Deepa Lakshmin of MTV News wrote that it is "equally infectious" as "Despacito". Ross McNeilage of the same publication deemed the song "an absolute powerhouse anthem that goes harder than 'Despacito' ever did", and gave credit to "Demi's flawless Spanish and [Fonsi and Lovato's] undeniable chemistry". Bianca Gracie of Fuse regarded it as "a welcomed refresher away from the ongoing 'Despacito' takeover".

Music video
The music video first takes place in Lovato's bedroom, before the duo meet up in an abandoned warehouse and hold a dance party. In its first 24 hours of release, the video accrued more than 17.4 million views, a record for Lovato.

As of June 2020, "Échame la Culpa" has reached 2 billion views, making it one of the site's 60 most-viewed videos.

Live performances
The song experienced its debut live performance ever on February 25, 2018, at Teatro Colón in Buenos Aires, Argentina, where Fonsi performed it together with Argentine singer TINI. Fonsi and Lovato made their duet debut performance during Lovato's Tell Me You Love Me World Tour at the American Airlines Arena in Miami, United States on March 30, 2018. On April 12, 2018, Fonsi performed the song live together with German singer Helene Fischer during a medley with "Despacito" at the German Echo Music Prize. On May 27, 2018, Fonsi performed the song with Lovato during the BBC Music's Biggest Weekend. The song is included in both Luis Fonsi's Love + Dance World Tour and Lovato's Tell Me You Love Me World Tour set list. Fonsi later performed the song at the 2019 Pan American Games in Perú alongside Peruvian singer Leslie Shaw.

Track listings
Digital download
"Échame la Culpa" – 2:53

Digital download – Not on You remix
"Échame la Culpa"  – 2:53

Charts

Weekly charts

Monthly charts

Year-end charts

Certifications

Release history

See also
 List of airplay number-one hits of the 2010s (Argentina)
 List of number-one hits of 2018 (Austria)
 List of number-one songs of 2018 (Bolivia)
 List of number-one songs of 2018 (Guatemala)
 List of number-one songs of 2018 (Lebanon)
 List of number-one songs of 2018 (Mexico)
 List of Billboard number-one Latin songs of 2018

References

2017 songs
2017 singles
Demi Lovato songs
Luis Fonsi songs
Songs written by Luis Fonsi
Songs written by Andrés Torres (producer)
Song recordings produced by Andrés Torres (producer)
Universal Music Latino singles
Republic Records singles
Island Records singles
Spanglish songs
Male–female vocal duets
Number-one singles in Austria
Number-one singles in Spain
Number-one singles in Honduras
Number-one singles in Lebanon
Monitor Latino Top General number-one singles
Songs containing the I–V-vi-IV progression
Songs written by Mauricio Rengifo